Mark Rodney James Petchey (born 1 August 1970) is a former tennis player from England, who turned professional in 1988.

He now works as a tennis commentator and analyst for Amazon Prime, ITV, the BBC, the Tennis Channel and others.

Personal life
Petchey was educated at Forest School, a private school in north-east London.

His first coach was his father, Rod.

Mark married Michelle on 5 July 1996 in Warwickshire: they have two daughters, Nicole and Myah.

Tennis career

Juniors

Junior Slam results:

Australian Open: -
French Open: 1R (1988)
Wimbledon: 2R (1988)
US Open: 3R (1987)

Pro tour
The right-hander won one doubles title (Nottingham in 1996) in his career. He reached his career-high ATP singles ranking of World No. 80 in August 1994, winning 3 Challenger events. His best performance in a Grand Slam came in the 1997 Wimbledon Championships. He defeated Ján Krošlák and Tommy Haas before losing to Boris Becker in the third round.

As a coach
He coached Silvija Talaja to the world's Top 20 and Tina Pisnik to the Top 30.

He was also coach to Andy Murray whom he coached to the Top 50.

Career finals

Doubles (1 win, 1 loss)

References

External links
 
 
 

1970 births
Living people
English male tennis players
People educated at Forest School, Walthamstow
People from Loughton
English tennis coaches
Tennis people from Greater London
Tennis commentators
British male tennis players